Toni-Luisa Reinemann (born 31 May 2001) is a German handball player for VfL Oldenburg in the Frauen Handball-Bundesliga.

Reinemann represented the Germany women's national beach handball team, where she participated at the 2019 European Beach Handball Championship, placing 10th. At the tournament, she became the team's top scorer with 62 points.

In the 2019–20 season, Reinemann became part of the first team in VfL Oldenburg, due to various injuries on the team. In October 2019, she signed a professional contract with the club.

In December 2022, she was nominated for a German Handball Award Women among 10 other players, but didn't win.

Achievements
German Cup 
Winner:' 2018Runner-up:'' 2022

References

External links

2001 births
Living people
German female handball players
People from Würzburg (district)